

Chief Ministers

Members of Parliament (Lok Sabha)

Provisional Parliament (1947-1952)

First parliament (1952-1957)

Second Parliament (1957-1962)

Third Parliament (1962-1967) 

Fourth Parliament (1967-1971)

Fifth Parliament (1971-1971)

Akhilesh Yadav, Ex- Chief Minister of Uttar Pradesh, President, Samajwadi Party, Member of Parliament from Azamgarh (Lok Sabha constituency).
 Captain Ajay Singh Yadav, former Cabinet Minister of Haryana.
 Ajesh Yadav, MLA Delhi Assembly, AAP.
 Akshay Yadav, M.P. in the 16th Lok Sabha.
 Anand Sen Yadav, Ex Minister of UP from BSP.
 Anil Kumar Yadav, a politician from Bihar.
 Anil Kumar Yadav, Minister of Irrigation(Water Resources) Government of Andhra Pradesh.
 Anita Yadav, politician, Former Minister Haryana Congress.
 Anjan Kumar Yadav, former M.P. for Secunderabad.
 Anjaiah Yelganamoni Yadav, MLA of Telangana.
 Arun Subhashchandra Yadav, former Union Minister.
 Arvind Singh Yadav, MLA, Chhibramau, SP.
 Annapurna Devi Yadav, Union Minister of State for Education, Government of India.
 Bodhmaya Kumari Yadav, Union Minister Of state for Education, Science and Technology, Government of Nepal.
 Bindheshwari Prasad Mandal, Former Chief Minister of Bihar, Chairman of Mandal Commission.
 Badulgula Lingaiah Yadav, Member of the Parliament and leader Telangana Rashtra Samithi party.
 Balram Yadav, Samajwadi Party leader, UP.
 Bhupender Yadav, Union Cabinet Minister of Labour and Employment, Environment, Forest and Climate Change. Government of India.
 Bhagabat Behera Yadav, former Cabinet Minister of Government of Odisha.
 Chitra Lekha Yadav, Former Minister of Education, Nepal Government, Former Deputy Speaker, Pratinidhi Sabha/Federal Parliament of Nepal.
 Chakradhar Behera Yadav,   Odisha Legislative Assembly.
 Chandrapal Singh Yadav, Member of Parliament Rajya Sabha/ Ex Member of Lok Sabha, Jhansi, SP.
 Chaudhary Brahm Prakash Yadav, former Chief Minister of Delhi.
 Chaudhary Harmohan Singh Yadav, Ex-MP Rajya Sabha, Shaurya Chakra awardee Politician.
 Dr. Ram Baran Yadav, Former President of Nepal, Former Union Health Minister of Nepal Government.
 Daroga Prasad Rai, Former Chief Minister Of Bihar.
 Darshan Singh Yadav, former Rajya Sabha MP of Uttar Pradesh.
 Dinesh Yadav, former member of Bihar Legislative Assembly.
 Deo Narayan Yadav, 12th Speaker of Bihar Legislative Assembly.
 Devender Yadav, Indian National Congress.
 Devendra Prasad Yadav, former RJD Leader.
 Devendra Singh Yadav, former M.P. for Etah.
 Darmananda Behera Yadav, former MLA of Choudwar-Cuttack (Odisha).
 Dharmendra Yadav, M.P., Samajwadi Party.
 Dimple Yadav, M.P. for Kannauj.
 D. P. Yadav, Former Cabinet Minister of U.P. Former MP Rajya Sabha, President, Rashtriya Parivartan Dal.
 Girish Yadav, State Minister, Uttar Pradesh, A BJP Leader.
 Gundeboina Rammurthy Yadav, former member of AP Legislative Assembly.
 Hansraj Gangaram Ahir, Former Union Minister of State for Home Affairs.
 Hitesh Kumar Bagartti Yadav, former Member of Odisha Legislative Assembly(BJP).
 Hukmdev Narayan Yadav, former Union Minister of State.
 Hemchand Yadav, Former Cabinet Minister of Chhattishgarh Government.
 Jaswant Singh Yadav, BJP, Rajasthan.
 Jay Prakash Narayan Yadav, former State Minister in Bihar.
 Kailash Nath Singh Yadav, Bahujan Samaj Party, Uttar Pradesh.
 Kanti Singh Yadav, former Union Minister.
 Karan Singh Yadav, Member of Lok Sabha form Alwar.
 Lalita Yadav, Minister of State of Madhya Pradesh Government, BJP Leader.
 Laloo Prasad Yadav, former Union Cabinet Minister of India, former Chief Minister of Bihar.
 Laxmi Narayan Yadav, M.P.and former Cabinet minister of Madhya Pradesh.
 Mulayam Singh Yadav, former Union Defence Minister of India and  Ex-Chief Minister of Uttar Pradesh.
 Madhusudan Yadav, former Lok Sabha MP and Mayor of Rajnandgaon Municipal Corporation, BJP.
 Mahinder Yadav, MLA, AAP.
 Manoj Yadav, former MLA of Bihar and MLA of Jharkhand.
 Mndakini Behera Yadav, former MLA of Nayagarh (Odisha).
 Mitrasen Yadav, Communist Party leader, Former Member of Parliament/Lok Sabha.
 Mousadhi Bag Yadav, member of Odisha Legislative Assembly from Dharamgarh constituency.
 Mulayam Singh Yadav (Auraiya politician), former Member of Uttar Pradesh Legislative Council (MLC) for 3 times(he is not the father of Akhilesh Yadav).
 Nagendra Singh Munna Yadav, M.L.A., Pratapgarh, Uttar Pradesh.
 Nand Kishore Yadav, Member of the Parliament of India representing Uttar Pradesh in the Rajya Sabha.
 Neera Yadav (politician), leader of Bharatiya Janata Party and former Education minister in government of Jharkhand.
 Om Prakash Yadav, Former Member of Parliament BJP, Siwan, Bihar.
 Om Parkash Yadav, Minister of Social justice and Empowerment, Sainik and Ardh Sainik Welfare, Government of Haryana.
 Pappu Yadav Rajesh Ranjan, President Jan Adhikar Party (Loktantrik), Five Times Member of Parliament from Purnia and Madhepura.
 Poonamben Maadam, Member of Parliament from Jamnagar (Lok Sabha constituency) , Gujarat.
 Pradeep Yadav, 13th Lok Sabha MP and MLA of Jharkhand state.
 Pramila Giri Yadav, former Member of Odisha Legislative Assembly from Baisinga (Mayurbhanj).
 Rabri Devi Yadav, former Chief Minister of Bihar and wife of Lalu Prasad Yadav.
 Nityanand Rai, Central Minister of state for Home Affairs,  Government Of India.
 Ram Sahaya Yadav, Union Minister of Environment and Forest, Nepal Government.
 Ram Bali Singh Yadav, former MLA of Bihar from Ghosi.
 Ram Chandra Yadav,MLA of Uttar Pradesh from Rudauli.
 Ramashray Prasad Singh Yadav, former member of Parliament (Lok Sabha) from Jahanabad.
 Ramakant Yadav, Four times Member of Parliament from Azamgarh (Lok Sabha constituency), Uttar Pradesh.
 Ramesh Prasad Yadav, former Member of Bihar Legislative Assembly.
 Rampal Yadav, SP leader.
 Ram Gopal Yadav, Rajya Sabha member.
 Ram Kripal Yadav, former Union Minister of State, BJP Leader, Member of Parliament/Lok Sabha.
 Ram Lakhan Singh Yadav, former Union Minister, member of Lok Sabha and Ex-MLA of Bihar.
 Ram Naresh Yadav, former Chief Minister of Uttar Pradesh, Former Governor Of Madhya Pradesh, Former Governor of Chhattisgarh.
 Rao Birendra Singh, Former Chief Minister of Haryana, Former Speaker, Haryana Vidhan Sabha, Former Agriculture Minister Of India.
 Col(RTD).Rao Ram Singh, Ex- Speaker of Haryana Vidhan Sabha, Former Union Minister of State.
 Rao Inderjit Singh, Central State Minister (Independent Charge), Government Of India.
 Ranjan Prasad Yadav, RJD politician, Bihar.
 Renu Kumari Yadav, Minister of Transport, Nepal Government.
 Rekha Yadav, Bharatiya Janshakti Party Malhara (Vidhan Sabha constituency) in Chhatarpur district, Madhya Pradesh.
 Sachin Ahir, Shiv Sena Leader from Mumbai.
 Satyapal Singh Yadav, BJP Leader, Former Union Minister of State, former Member of Lok Sabha from Shahjahanpur, Uttar Pradesh.
 Sadhu Yadav, politician, Bihar.
 Sangeeta Yadav, BJP leader from U.P., MLA.
 Sanatan Mahakud Yadav, former Member of Odisha Legislative Assembly from Champua.
 Sharad Yadav, Former Union Minister of Civil Aviation, Consumer Affairs, Labour and Employment, Government of India, Founder of JDU, Former President of Janata Dal.
 Shyamlal Yadav, Leader of Congress (I), Former Deputy Chairman of the Rajya Sabha.
 Subhash Yadav, former Deputy Chief Minister of Madhya Pradesh.
 Sudha Yadav, BJP, Leader, Member of National Other Backward Classes Commission, Ex-Lok Sabha MP from Mahendragarh Haryana.
 Sunanda Das Yadav, Member of Odisha Legislative Assembly from Bari constituency.
 Sunil Kumar Singh Yadav, Bahujan Samaj Party, Uttar Pradesh.
 Surendra Prasad Yadav, former Industrial Minister of Bihar & Jharkhand and Ex-MLA of Bihar he also served as an MP of 12th Lok Sabha.
 Talasani Srinivas Yadav, Minister of State in Government of Telangana(Telangana Rashtra Samithi).
 Tejashwi Yadav, Ex-Deputy Chief Minister, Bihar State.
 Tej Pratap Yadav, Ex-Minister for Health, Bihar.
 Tej Pratap Singh Yadav, M.P. for Mainpuri.
 Uday Pratap Singh, Former Member Of Loksabha From Manipuri, Former Member Of Rajya Sabha From Uttar Pradesh, President, All India Yadav Mahasabha, Teacher Of Mulayam Singh Yadav, Poet, Former Chairman, Hindi Sahitya Academy.
 Upendra Yadav, Chairperson, People's Socialist Party, Nepal, House Leader in Pratinidhi Sabha, Former Deputy Prime Minister Of Nepal, Former External Affairs Minister of Nepal Government.
 Umakant Yadav, Former Member of Parliament From Machhlishahr Loksabha Seat of Uttar Pradesh
 Uma Kant Yadav, Bihar Legislative Assembly.
 Umlesh Yadav, former MLA for Bisauli Uttar Pradesh.
 Vasanbhai Ahir, MLA, Former Minister of Gujarat.
 Vijay Bahadur Yadav, MLA, Gorakhpur Rural.
 Vikrambhai Arjanbhai Madam, Former Member of Parliament , Indian National Congress Leader from Gujrat.
 Yogendra Yadav, Leader of Swaraj Abhiyan.
 Arun Gawli , Leader from  Maharastra
Sachin Ahir , MLA from Maharastra
Krishna Gau  , MLA from Madhya Pradesh
Babanrao Lonikar, MLA from Maharastra 
Sachin Yadav, MLA from Madhya Pradesh

See also

References 

Lists of politicians